Kate Rooney Mara (born February 27, 1983) is an American actress. She is known for work in television, playing reporter Zoe Barnes in the Netflix political drama House of Cards (2013–2014; 2016), computer analyst Shari Rothenberg in the Fox thriller series 24 (2006), wronged mistress Hayden McClaine in the FX miniseries American Horror Story: Murder House (2011), Patty Bowes in the first season of the FX drag ball culture drama series Pose (2018), and a teacher who begins an illicit relationship with an underage student, in the FX on Hulu miniseries A Teacher (2020). For the latter, she received an Independent Spirit nomination for Best New Scripted Series as an executive producer.

Mara made her film debut in Random Hearts (1999). She has since appeared in Brokeback Mountain (2005), We Are Marshall (2006), Shooter (2007), Transsiberian (2008), Stone of Destiny (2008), The Open Road (2009), Transcendence (2014), The Martian (2015), Fantastic Four (2015), Morgan (2016), Megan Leavey (2017), My Days of Mercy (2017), and Chappaquiddick (2018).

Early life
Kate Rooney Mara was born on February 27, 1983, in Bedford, New York. Her parents are Timothy Christopher Mara, an NFL scout and vice president of the New York Giants for player evaluation, and Kathleen McNulty Mara (née Rooney). She is the second of four siblings, with one older brother, Daniel; one younger sister, the actress Patricia "Rooney"; and one younger brother, Conor. Her ancestry is Irish, one quarter Italian, and smaller amounts of German, French-Canadian, and English. Her father is one of 11 children, through whom she has 20 aunts and uncles, and 40 cousins.

She is a great-granddaughter of both New York Giants founder Tim Mara and Pittsburgh Steelers founder Art Rooney, Sr. Her mother's side of the family has held ownership in the NFL's Pittsburgh Steelers football team since its formation in 1933, and her father's side of the family has held ownership in the NFL's New York Giants since its formation in 1925. Her paternal grandparents were Wellington Mara and Ann Mara. Wellington co-owned the Giants football team from 1959 until his death in 2005, and was succeeded by his son (Kate Mara's uncle), John Mara, who is currently President, CEO, and co-owner of the team. Kate Mara's maternal grandfather, Timothy James "Tim" Rooney, has operated Yonkers Raceway in Yonkers, New York since 1972. Her granduncle, Dan Rooney, chairman of the Steelers, was a former United States Ambassador to Ireland and the co-founder of the charitable organization The Ireland Funds. Her first cousin, once removed, Art Rooney II, is the current President and co-owner of the Steelers.

Mara began acting at the age of nine in a school musical. She attended several youth theater-arts schools and appeared in community theater and in school plays. In an Esquire magazine interview, she says she was "painfully shy" growing up, adding she only had one friend.

Her first audition was for the NBC police drama Homicide: Life on the Street. She did not get the role, but knew from then on she wanted to act. Mara graduated from Fox Lane High School a year early, and was accepted into the Tisch School of the Arts at New York University to study musical theater, but deferred her slot to work as an actress.

Career

Television and stage
Mara's first television role was in the NBC legal drama Law & Order in 1997. She went on to guest star on numerous television series, including Madigan Men, Ed and Law & Order: Special Victims Unit. Mara landed two recurring roles in 2003, as Kate on Everwood, an 18-year-old who is impregnated by her piano teacher and then gets an abortion, and as Vanessa on Nip/Tuck, a bisexual cheerleader involved in a love triangle with her boyfriend Matt McNamara (John Hensley) and another cheerleader (Sophia Bush). Mara also appeared on Cold Case, Boston Public, CSI: Miami and CSI: Crime Scene Investigation that same year.

Mara was cast as the lead in the 2004 The WB pilot Prodigy, about a teenage child prodigy. She had a recurring role on the WB's Jack & Bobby in 2005 and a five-episode arc on the Fox TV series 24 in 2006, playing computer analyst Shari Rothenberg. Mara joined the cast of the HBO comedy-drama Entourage for the series' sixth season in 2009. She played Brittany, Eric "E" Murphy (Kevin Connolly)'s assistant at his talent-management company and a potential love interest. Mara filmed four episodes for the series in 2009. In 2011, she guest starred on the FX horror series American Horror Story, as Hayden McClaine, a student who becomes Dr. Ben Harmon (Dylan McDermott)'s dead mistress, a spirit trapped in the Harmon house. Mara was offered the role by Ryan Murphy, her former producer on Nip/Tuck.

In 2012, Mara joined the cast of House of Cards, playing the part of Zoe Barnes, an intrepid reporter from Washington, D.C. who becomes a major ally to Frank Underwood by leaking stories that undermine his rivals. She filmed a second season of the series, which was released on February 14, 2014. On July 10, 2014, she was nominated for the Primetime Emmy Award for Outstanding Guest Actress in a Drama Series.

Mara's stage debut, in 2003, was at the Williamstown Theatre Festival in John Guare's Landscape of the Body with Lili Taylor. Mara starred in The Alice Complex, a play by Peter Barr Nickowitz, at Dixon Place in New York City in 2005, and at the Blank Theatre in Los Angeles in 2006. The production co-starred Tony Award-winner Harriet Harris. In 2006, she told WFAN radio that theater is a "dream" because it was "all I really wanted to do as a kid. I didn't care about movies or TV, I just wanted to do Broadway".

Film
Mara made her film debut in Random Hearts, with Harrison Ford in 1999, directed by Sydney Pollack. She played Jessica Chandler, the daughter of a congresswoman (Kristin Scott Thomas). She next appeared in the Sundance Film Festival award-winning films Joe the King (1999) and Tadpole (2002), alongside Sigourney Weaver. Mara co-starred in Peoples (2004), a drama and coming of age story filmed in Louisville, Kentucky. She starred in the direct-to-video horror film Urban Legends: Bloody Mary and appeared with Noah Wyle and Illeana Douglas in the 2005 film The Californians. Her supporting role as the daughter of Heath Ledger's character in the Academy Award-winning film Brokeback Mountain that year brought her more widespread critical notice.

Mara signed with the William Morris Agency, and was included on the New York Daily News list of "10 young actors who have a shot at making it big" at the start of 2006. She appeared in Zoom that year as Summer Jones (aka Wonder), a 16-year-old girl with telekinetic and empathic abilities. She next appeared in We Are Marshall, starring Matthew McConaughey, which recalled the aftermath of the 1970 Marshall University plane crash that took the lives of most of the football team. Mara played cheerleader Annie Cantrell.

In 2007, she appeared in the comedy Full of It with Ryan Pinkston for New Line Cinema. The film later aired on television as Big Liar on Campus. Mara was also featured in an advertising campaign for clothing retailer Gap called, "khakis with attitude." She appeared in Shooter, a thriller about a master sniper portrayed by Mark Wahlberg, lured out of retirement to prevent an assassination. Mara played a Kentucky widow, Sarah Fenn, adopting a southern accent for the role.

Also in 2007, she finished her work in the film Transsiberian, by Brad Anderson, which takes place on the Trans-Siberian Railway that runs from China to Moscow. She spent three months shooting the thriller in Vilnius, Lithuania, starting in December 2006. The film also shot on location in Beijing and Russia. Mara played Abby, a 20-year-old runaway from Seattle. Transsiberian premiered at the 2008 Sundance Film Festival in January.

Mara starred in the 2008 film Stone of Destiny, written and directed by Charles Martin Smith, about the theft of the Stone of Scone on Christmas Day, 1950. Mara played Kay Matheson, one of four students that removed the stone in a Scottish nationalist plot. The period adventure-comedy co-starred Billy Boyd, Robert Carlyle and Charlie Cox. Filming began in June 2007 in locations around Glasgow. Mara felt lucky and proud to play a role that was important to people's heritage. She stayed near the Botanic Gardens in the city's West End while filming, attending the film premiere at the Edinburgh International Film Festival on June 21, 2008. The film closed the 2008 Toronto International Film Festival on September 13, 2008.

In December 2008, Mara appeared in T Takes: Brooklyn 09, a series of 6 improvised short films directed by Brody Baker. She starred in The Open Road as Lucy.

In 2009, Mara filmed the independent comedy Peep World, starring Michael C. Hall, Sarah Silverman and Rainn Wilson, and joined the cast of Marvel's Iron Man 2, making a cameo appearance as a U.S. Marshal who serves Tony Stark a subpoena. Mara shot the ensemble romantic comedy Happy. Thank You. More. Please. in New York City in July 2009. She plays a waitress and aspiring singer named Mississippi, in a story about six single New Yorkers in their 20s. The film was written and directed by actor Josh Radnor (How I Met Your Mother). The film won the U.S. Dramatic Audience Award at the 2010 Sundance Film Festival. In 2010, Mara played hiker Kristi Moore in the survival drama 127 Hours, a true story directed by Danny Boyle about Aron Ralston, a climber trapped while mountaineering in Utah.

Mara appeared in Ironclad (2011), which tells the story of the siege of Rochester Castle by King John in the year 1215. It is her first film where she speaks in an English accent. Mara appeared in the short film Ten Year, produced by Channing Tatum to attract financing for a feature film. The full-length feature went into production in Albuquerque in January 2010, with Mara starring in a large ensemble cast film about a 10-year high school reunion. In 2012, Mara starred in Stefan Ruzowitzky's thriller Deadfall with Eric Bana and Olivia Wilde. In 2013, Mara starred in Broken Bells video for the song Holding On For Life. Mara appeared in Transcendence (2014), starring Johnny Depp and directed by Wally Pfister.

In 2015, she played Sue Storm, the Invisible Woman, in the Fantastic Four reboot. In that year, she also had a supporting role as astronaut Beth Johanssen in director Ridley Scott's film The Martian. She also starred as Ashley Smith in the movie Captive.

In 2017, Mara starred in Megan Leavey, playing Megan Leavey, a real-life U.S. marine who bonded with her military working dog. The film was directed by Gabriela Cowperthwaite, and released on June 9, 2017.

She also starred alongside Elliot Page in My Days of Mercy, which she co-produced.

Personal life
In 2015, Mara began dating her Fantastic Four co-star Jamie Bell. In January 2017, the couple were engaged. On July 17, 2017, the couple announced that they had married. As a result, Mara became the stepmother to Bell's son from his marriage to Evan Rachel Wood. In May 2019, the couple's daughter was born. On November 17, 2022, Mara announced on Instagram that she had given birth to a son the week before. Mara lives in Los Angeles and Manhattan. 

Mara credits her vegan diet and regular workouts for keeping fit. "I'm a massive animal lover, too," she explained. "Being vegan has been so good for me. I never felt better." Mara is one of the faces of the Humane Society of the United States. In 2015, she was featured in one of their campaign videos to promote Meatless Monday.

As a descendant of the owners of the New York Giants and Pittsburgh Steelers, Mara is a fan of both teams; she joked, "If I'm mad at my mom, I root for the Giants, and if I'm pissed at my dad, I root for the Steelers." This relationship contributed to her role in We Are Marshall. Mara has sung at both teams' games, and after missing the Steelers' 2006 victory at Super Bowl XL due to work, her contracts state she can attend if either team goes to the Super Bowl. She was in attendance for the Giants' victory in Super Bowl XLII, the Steelers' victory the next year in Super Bowl XLIII, and the Giants' victory in Super Bowl XLVI.

Filmography

Film

Television

References

Further reading
 Kernan, Kevin (September 24, 2006). "Hollywood Giant". New York Post.
 Vranish, Jane (February 26, 2006). ""The Insiders: 2/26/06"". Pittsburgh Post-Gazette.

External links

 
 

1983 births
20th-century American actresses
21st-century American actresses
Actresses from New York (state)
American child actresses
American film actresses
American people of English descent
American people of French-Canadian descent
American people of German descent
American people of Irish descent
American people of Italian descent
American stage actresses
American television actresses
American voice actresses
Living people
Mara family
People from Bedford, New York
Rooney family
Tisch School of the Arts alumni